The name Greta is derived from the name Margareta, which comes from the Greek word margarites or "pearl".

Notable people with the name include:

Greta Almroth (1888–1981), Swedish actress
Greta Andersen (1927–2023), Danish swimmer
Gréta Arn (born 1979), Hungarian tennis player
Greta Svabo Bech (born 1987), Faroese singer
Greta Bösel (1908–1947), German Nazi concentration camp guard and nurse executed for war crimes
Greta Chi, Danish actress
Greta Christina (born 1961), American atheist author and activist
Greta Cicolari (born 1981), Italian beach volleyball player
Greta Duréel (died 1696), Swedish fraud
Greta Espinoza (born 1995), Mexican footballer
Greta Garbo (1905–1990), Swedish-American actress
Greta Gerwig (born 1983), American actress and filmmaker
Greta Grönholm (1923–2015), Finnish canoeist
Greta Gynt (1916–2000), Norwegian singer, dancer and actress
Greta Hällfors-Sipilä (1899–1974), Finnish painter
Greta Hodgkinson (born 1973), American-Canadian ballet dancer
Grethe Hjort (1903–1967), Danish  writer and professor of Danish and English literature
Greta Johansson (1895–1978), Swedish diver and swimmer
Greta Johnson (born 1977), American lawyer and politician
Greta Kempton (1901–1991), American painter
Gréta Kerekes (born 1992), Hungarian hurdler
Greta Kline, (born 1994), American musician
Greta Knutson (1899–1983), Swedish artist, poet and critic
Greta Lee (born 1983), American actress
Greta M. Ljung (born 1941), Finnish-American statistician
Greta Magnusson-Grossman (1906–1999), Swedish designer and architect
Greta Mikalauskytė, Lithuanian beauty pageant contestant
Greta Molander (1908–2002), Swedish-Norwegian rally driver and writer
Greta Morkytė (born 1999), Lithuanian figure skater
Greta N. Morris, American diplomat
Greta Naterberg (1772–1818), Swedish folk singer
Greta Neimanas (born 1988), American Paralympic cyclist
Greta Nissen (1906–1988), Norwegian-American actress
Greta Podleski, Canadian chef, author and television host
Greta De Reyghere, Belgian soprano
Greta Richioud (born 1996), French cyclist
Greta Scacchi (born 1960), Italian-Australian actress
Greta Schröder (1891–1967), German actress
Greta Salpeter (born 1988), American singer
Greta Skogster (1900–1994), Finnish textile artist
Greta Salóme Stefánsdóttir (born 1986), Icelandic singer and violinist
Greta Mjöll Samúelsdóttir (born 1987), Icelandic singer and footballer
Greta Schiller (born 1954), American film director
Greta Small (born 1995), Australian alpine skier
Greta Stevenson (1911–1990), New Zealand botanist and mycologist
Gréta Szakmáry (born 1991), Hungarian volleyball player
Greta Thunberg (born 2003), climate change activist from Sweden
Greta Thyssen (1927–2018), Danish-American actress
Greta Vaillant (1942–2000), French actress
Greta Van Susteren (born 1954), American television journalist
Greta Wrage von Pustau (1902–1989), German dancer

Fictional characters 

 Greta, character from Liar Liar portrayed by Anne Haney
 Greta, character on Lost portrayed by Lana Parrilla
 Greta (Chuck), one of several characters on Chuck
 Greta, character from The Sisterhood of the Traveling Pants 2 portrayed by Blythe Danner
 Greta, hair salon assistant at Christian Grey's choice salon in Fifty Shades Darker
 Greta von Amberg, character on the soap opera Days of Our Lives
 Greta, a female Gremlin from the 1990 horror comedy movie Gremlins 2: The New Batch
 Greta Catchlove, witch from the Harry Potter series, also known as Gerda Curd
 Greta Gibson, character in A Nightmare on Elm Street 5: The Dream Child portrayed by Erika Anderson
 Greta Grimly from TV's Fargo, portrayed by Joey King
 Dr. Greta Guttman, character on Mad Men
 Greta Hayes, Secret (Greta Hayes) in DC Comics
 Greta James, a struggling musician played by Keira Knightley in Begin Again
 Dr. Greta Mantleray, famous therapist and mother to another character in Maniac (miniseries)
 Greta Martin, character on The Vampire Diaries, portrayed by Lisa Tucker
 Greta Matthews, character from short-lived CW cult show Hidden Palms
 Greta McClure, character on Family Matters portrayed by Tammy Townsend
 Greta O'Donnell, main character from the movie According to Greta played by Hilary Duff
 Greta Ohlsson, character from Murder on the Orient Express
 Greta Wolfcastle, the daughter of Rainier Wolfcastle from The Simpsons voiced by Reese Witherspoon
 Greta, the main character in Projection: First Light

Feminine given names
Danish feminine given names
Estonian feminine given names
German feminine given names
Given names derived from gemstones
Norwegian feminine given names
Swedish feminine given names
Lists of people by given name